Lawless Heart is a 2001 British film directed by Tom Hunsinger and Neil Hunter. It had its world premiere at the Locarno Film Festival, where it won the Prix CICAE / Arte. It also won Best Screenplay at the British Independent Film Awards in 2002, where it was additionally nominated for Best British Independent Film, Best Director, Best Actor (Bill Nighy) and Best Technical Achievement (editor Scott Thomas). At the Evening Standard British Film Awards the next year, it was awarded Best Screenplay. 

The film is set amidst the coastal marshes around Maldon, Essex. The film's structure was inspired by Eric Rohmer's Les Rendez-vous de Paris.

Plot
A group of friends, lovers and relatives assemble for the funeral of Stuart. Devastated by Stuart's death, his brother-in-law, lover and best friend decide to take their lives in hand. Dan is a faithful and loving father and husband, until the day he meets Corinne. This buxom and sublime Frenchwoman seduces Dan with her honesty and hedonism, so much so that he wonders if he hasn't missed out on life. Nick, a gay restaurant owner, begins a relationship with a high-spirited young woman right after losing his lover, Stuart. When their apparently innocent relationship takes a more intimate turn, Nick is troubled by his feelings for his female comrade. Tim, carefree and charismatic, comes home after eight years abroad. Still looking for that "elusive something" that has been missing in his life, Tim finds it in a woman who works in a fashion boutique. But confronted with his future for the first time, the only thing that stands in the way is this unknown woman's past.

Cast

Reception
, 87% of the 53 reviews compiled by Rotten Tomatoes are positive, with an average score of 7.2/10. The website's critics consensus reads: "Unconventional and refreshing, this strikingly un-Hollywood film takes a quiet and heartbreaking look at the warmth and inspiration of friendships lost."

References

External links
 
 

2001 comedy films
2001 comedy-drama films
2001 drama films
2001 films
2001 LGBT-related films
British comedy-drama films
British LGBT-related films
Films set in Essex
2000s English-language films
2000s British films